Marco Antonio Bueno Ontiveros (born 31 March 1994) is a Mexican professional footballer who plays as a forward.

Club career

CF Pachuca
Born in Culiacán, Bueno started his career in the youth system of CF Pachuca. He was loaned to Leon during the Liga Ascenso Clausura 2011 season and made only one appearance as a starter but was subbed off after 58 minutes without having scored. He returned to Pachuca at the end of the season. He made his official debut for CF Pachuca on 8 October 2011 against Chiapas on 83rd minute for Mauro Cejas on the 12th match of the Apertura 2011.

On the Clausura 2012 Bueno played 2 minutes in the 0-0 Draw against Santos Laguna on the 1st match of the tournament on 7 January 2012. Bueno scored his first two goals the following week against Puebla on the 2nd match of the tournament.

Estudiantes Tecos
Marco Bueno was loaned out to Estudiantes Tecos from CF Pachuca on 1 January 2014. He went on to help Estudiantes Tecos win the playoffs and enter a chance to get promoted to top division, Liga MX, but lost the promotion game against Leones Negros on penalties.

Deportivo Toluca F.C.
Marco Bueno was loaned from CF Pachuca to Toluca. He has played in 2 friendly preseason matches against Mineros De Zacatecas which resulted as a loss. The next pre-season friendly he was in was against Queretaro FC which ended up as a tie. Bueno made his league debut for Toluca being substituted in for Richard Ortiz in the 73 minute against Club Leon in a 2–3 loss.

Club León
Pachuca loaned Marco Bueno back to Leon, this time in Liga MX for the 2015–16 season. He was given the number 11 shirt.
On 12 September, Bueno came off the bench at minute 57 and scored his first goal with Leon at minute 75 losing to Chiapas.

———Atlas———

Marco Bueno then went on to play one season at Atlas during the 16/17 season

HJK Helsinki
After his loan in Chile at Everton and not finding a spot in Pachuca for the Clausura 2019, Marco Bueno joined HJK on trial on 21 March 2019 as a free agent, Marco played two days later and scored on his debut in a friendly match. On March 26, 2019, he signed a 1+1 contract.

International career

Mexico U-17
Bueno was selected by manager Raul Gutierrez to compete in the 2011 FIFA U-17 World Cup. He would compete in every match scoring only 1 goal against Panama in the round of 16. He would eventually go on and win the tournament at the Estadio Azteca becoming the first home nation to win it on home soil.

Mexico national team
On 15 April 2015, Bueno made his debut with the Mexico national team in a friendly game against the United States.

Career statistics

Club

International

Honours
Tecos
Ascenso MX: Clausura 2014

Guadalajara
Supercopa MX: 2016

Monterrey
Copa MX: Apertura 2017

Comunicaciones 
CONCACAF League: 2021

Mexico Youth
FIFA U-17 World Cup: 2011
CONCACAF U-20 Championship: 2013
Central American and Caribbean Games: 2014
Pan American Silver Medal: 2015
CONCACAF Olympic Qualifying Championship: 2015

Individual
Mexican Primera División Rookie of the Tournament: Clausura 2012

References

External links
 
 
 
 
 
 

1994 births
Living people
Association football forwards
Mexican footballers
Mexican expatriate footballers
Mexico youth international footballers
Mexico under-20 international footballers
Mexico international footballers
Liga MX players
Chilean Primera División players
Veikkausliiga players
C.F. Pachuca players
Tecos F.C. footballers
Deportivo Toluca F.C. players
Club León footballers
C.D. Guadalajara footballers
C.F. Monterrey players
Everton de Viña del Mar footballers
Helsingin Jalkapalloklubi players
Expatriate footballers in Chile
Expatriate footballers in Finland
Mexican expatriate sportspeople in Chile
Footballers from Sinaloa
Sportspeople from Culiacán
Footballers at the 2015 Pan American Games
Footballers at the 2016 Summer Olympics
Olympic footballers of Mexico
Pan American Games medalists in football
Pan American Games silver medalists for Mexico
Central American and Caribbean Games medalists in football
Central American and Caribbean Games gold medalists for Mexico
Competitors at the 2014 Central American and Caribbean Games
Medalists at the 2015 Pan American Games